Ciocile is a commune located in Brăila County, Muntenia, Romania. It is composed of four villages: Chichinețu, Chioibășești, Ciocile and Odăieni.

Chichinețu village was renamed Ștefan Gheorghiu by Romania's communist authorities; its previous name was restored in 1996.

Natives
 Florea Fătu
 Billy Gladstone

References

Communes in Brăila County
Localities in Muntenia